

Career

Early life 
Vikram Thakor is a native of Fatehpura village near Gandhinagar in Gujarat. Thakor started singing and playing flute on stage at age of ten with his father Melaji Thakor, a folk and kirtan singer. Initially reluctant to enter the film industry, he debuted in Ek Var Piyu Ne Malva Aavje (2006) which was a commercial hit. He starred in several Gujarati films chiefly targeted to rural audience.  All eight of his films have been successful at the box office.

Thakor's other successful films include Radha Tara Vina Gamtu Nathi (2007), Vaagi Kalje Katari Tara Premni (2010), Premi Zukya Nathi ne Zukshe Nahi (2011) and Rasiya Tari Radha Rokani Rann Ma (2014). His six films earned  and in 2015 he was considered a superstar of Gujarati cinema in various media. 

He lives in Gandhinagar.

Controversy
Following a police investigation, no charges were brought and the matter was dismissed.

Filmography
{{columns-list|colwidth=30em|
 Ek Var Piyu Ne Malva Aavje (2006)
 Amdavad Palanpur Vaya Kadi Kalol
 Prem Gori Taro Kem Kari Bhulay
 Main To Odhi Chundaldi Tara Namni
 Preet Janamo Janam Ni Bhulase Nahin
 Radha Tara Vina Mane Gamtu Nathi (2007)
 Bewafa Pardeshi (2007)
 Tane Parki Manu Ke Manu Potani
 Radha Chudlo Perje Mara Nam No
 Chundadi Odhi Tara Naam Ni
 Vaagi Kalje Katari Tara Prem Ni (2010)
 Piyu Tara Vina Mane Eklu Lage (2010)
 Premi Zukya Nathi ne Zukshe Nahi (2011)
 Aakha Jag Thi Niraali Mari Saajna
 Shakti - The Power
 Sukh Ma Dashama Dukh Ma Dashama
 Maa Baap Na Aashirvad (2014)
 Patan Thi Pakistan
 Ek Prem no Divano Ek Prem ni Divani
  Haiye Dashama Honthe Dashama
 Radha Rahisu Sadaye Sangathe
 Rasiya Tari Radha Rokani Rann Ma (2014)<ref name="Akilanews.com 2015">

References

External links

Living people
People from Gandhinagar district
Gujarati-language singers
Male actors in Gujarati-language films
Indian male playback singers
Year of birth missing (living people)
Indian film actors